130–136 Piccotts End is a medieval timber framed building in Piccotts End in Hertfordshire, England. Originally a hall house, the structure has been divided into a row of cottages. 
Two of the cottages are of interest for the art they contain.
Important 15th century murals were discovered, at 132, in 1953 and the entire building was listed Grade I the following year. Later murals have been recorded at 134.

Location
Piccotts End is a village in the north of the parish of Hemel Hempstead. The original function of the building is not known. It has been suggested that the building was connected with Ashridge Priory, which was in existence from the thirteenth to the sixteenth century.

Murals

Inside the house at number 132 are a number of fifteenth-century religious wall paintings, which are of particular interest to historians as a rare example of pre-Reformation English Catholic art. The paintings are thought to originate from around 1470–1500. Following the English Reformation, religious art came to be regarded as a form of idolatry and many works were obliterated or destroyed; for this reason, some of the faces in the Piccotts End murals were mutilated and the paintings subsequently covered over by whitewash. They remained hidden for over 400 years until they were uncovered in 1953 by a resident.

The origins of the paintings are unknown. Historians surmise that the Piccotts End house may have served as a hospice for pilgrims, as it was located close to a pilgrim trail which went via the nearby Monastery of the Bonhommes at Ashridge. At Ashridge, pilgrims could venerate a phial of the Blood of Christ before proceeding to St Albans Abbey to venerate the holy relics of Saint Alban. The art historian E. Clive Rouse has noted that the murals exhibit a technique of woodcut illustration dating from the late 15th and early 16th centuries, suggesting the influence of the artistic style of the Low Countries.

The wall paintings consist of five panels, arranged in a type of iconostasis, resembling a large screen covered with icons, set in tiers. In the centre panel is Christ in Majesty, with the "IHS" Sacred Monogram in the halo.  In the right panel is depicted the  Baptism of Jesus by Saint John the Baptist; in the background an archangel holds Christ's robes. On the extreme right is a badly damaged image of Saint Clement, the third Pope with a symbolic anchor on each shoulder and the Papal cross. The left panel contains a Pietà (the Virgin Mary holding the dead Christ), and on the far left is a representation of Saint Peter wearing the Papal Tiara, with a Papal cross and the Keys of Heaven. In the two lower panels are paintings of figures of St Catherine of Alexandria (with her Catherine wheel)  and Saint Margaret of Antioch emerging from the belly of a dragon. Many figures are depicted wearing typical Tudor dress. They are decorated with orange-red, grey and blue and white foliation with yellow fruit and flowers. A blank space in the lower wall suggests the former presence of an altar.

It has been suggested that some of the symbolism contained in the wall paintings indicate connections with the doctrines of Catharism, a sect considered heretical by the Catholic Church.

Hospital
In the 1820s the building was converted for use as a cottage hospital by the anatomist and surgeon Sir Astley Cooper.
In the early 1830s the number of patients increased because of injuries to workers constructing the London to Birmingham railway. Accordingly, the hospital moved to larger premises at Cheere House in Hemel Hempstead in 1832.

See also
Dean Incent's House
Art in the Protestant Reformation and Counter-Reformation
Medieval art

Access
In recent years there has been limited opening of No. 132, which is privately owned. The public has been able to visit under the Heritage Open Days scheme. In 2014 a local conservation charity, the Dacorum Heritage Trust, launched an appeal to raise funds to buy the property.

References

External links

The Piccotts End paintings

15th-century paintings
Cottage hospitals
Buildings and structures in Dacorum
Defunct hospitals in Hertfordshire
Grade I listed buildings in Hertfordshire
Grade I listed houses
Houses in Hertfordshire
Religious paintings
Timber framed buildings in Hertfordshire